is a 2013 Japanese war drama film directed by Yasuo Furuhata. It is based on the book by Kappa Senoh, translated into English by John Bester.

Cast
Yutaka Mizutani
Ran Ito
Tatsuki Yoshioka

Reception

Box office
The film grossed US$15.3 million in Japan.

Accolades
It was chosen as the 7th best Japanese film of 2013 by the film magazine Eiga Geijutsu.

References

External links
 

2013 films
2013 war drama films
Films directed by Yasuo Furuhata
Japanese war drama films
Toho films
2013 drama films
Films scored by Yoshihiro Ike
Japanese World War II films
2010s Japanese films